Bekhal Waterfall is located in the mountainous northern part of the country in the Kurdistan Region, in Erbil Governorate. It is located 10 km west of Rawandiz and 135 km from Erbil. This waterfall hosts many visitors and tourists across the country.

References

Waterfalls of Iraq
Erbil Governorate
Tourist attractions in Iraqi Kurdistan